The 1970 Rice Owls football team was an American football team that represented Rice University in the Southwest Conference (SWC) during the 1970 NCAA University Division football season. In its fourth and final season under head coach Bo Hagan, the team compiled a 5–5 record (3–4 against SWC opponents), tied for fourth place in the conference, and was outscored by a total of 175 to 168. The team played its home games at Rice Stadium in Houston.

The team's statistical leaders included Philip Wood with 489 passing yards and 30 points scored, Stahle Vincent with 453 rushing yards, and Mike Philips with 192 receiving yards. Two Rice players were selected by the Associated Press as first-team players on the 1970 All-Southwest Conference football team: middle guard Roger Roitsch and defensive back Bucky Allhouse.

Schedule

References

Rice
Rice Owls football seasons
Rice Owls football